Bouznika is a city in Casablanca-Settat, Morocco, in the historical region of Chaouia.

Etymology 
The city name means "Owner of the small alley" in Arabic.

References

External links
 http://www.ville-bouznika.com

Populated places in Benslimane Province
Municipalities of Morocco